Laurent Karim Agouazi (born 16 March 1984) is a professional footballer who plays as a midfielder for the reserve team of Metz. Born in France, as of June 2016 he has won two caps for the Algeria national football team.

Career
Born in Langres, France, Agouazi began his career with FC Metz and had a spell on loan with Championnat National side Besançon RC during the 2004–05 season. On 18 June 2009, US Boulogne-sur-Mer announced that it had the midfielder on a free transfer from Metz until June 2011. After two seasons with Boulogne he joined FC Istres, before moving to SM Caen on 8 June 2012. On 3 July 2015, Agouazi signed for Tours on a one-year deal. He signed a three-year contract with Chamois Niortais on 9 June 2016.

In January 2019, he returned to Metz to help the reserve team.

International career
Born in Langres, France, to an Algerian father and French mother, Agouazi was eligible to represent both Algeria and France. In May 2013, he received his first call-up to the Algeria national team.

Career statistics

References

External links
 Scoresway.com
 
 Profile at Foot-National.com

1984 births
Living people
People from Langres
Kabyle people
French sportspeople of Algerian descent
Algerian footballers
French footballers
Association football midfielders
FC Metz players
US Boulogne players
FC Istres players
Stade Malherbe Caen players
Atromitos F.C. players
Tours FC players
Chamois Niortais F.C. players
Ligue 1 players
Ligue 2 players
Championnat National players
Super League Greece players
Algeria international footballers
Sportspeople from Haute-Marne
Footballers from Grand Est
French expatriate footballers
French expatriate sportspeople in Greece
French expatriate sportspeople in Luxembourg
Racing FC Union Luxembourg players
Algerian expatriate sportspeople in Greece
Algerian expatriate sportspeople in Luxembourg
Algerian expatriate footballers
Expatriate footballers in Greece
Expatriate footballers in Luxembourg